Fat City is a 1972 American sports drama film directed by John Huston, and starring Stacy Keach, Jeff Bridges, Susan Tyrrell, and Candy Clark. Its plot follows a former champion boxer who begins to develop a rivalry with a younger boxer on the rise, whom he is training.

One of Huston's later films, it is based on the boxing novel Fat City (1969) by Leonard Gardner, who also wrote the screenplay.

Plot
Billy Tully, a boxer past his prime, goes to a gym in Stockton, California to get back into shape and spars with Ernie Munger, an 18-year-old he meets there. Seeing potential in the youngster, Tully suggests that Munger look up his former manager and trainer Ruben. Tully later tells combative barfly Oma and her easygoing boyfriend Earl how impressed he is with the kid. Newly inspired, Tully decides to get back into boxing himself.

Tully's life has been a mess since his wife left him. He drinks too much, cannot hold a job, and picks fruit and vegetables with migrant workers to make ends meet. He still blames Ruben for mishandling his last fight.

Tully tries moving in with Oma after Earl is sent to prison for a few months, but their relationship is rocky.

Munger loses his first fight, his nose broken, and he is knocked out in his next bout as well. He gets pressured into marriage by Faye because a baby's on the way, so he picks fruit in the fields for a few dollars.

For his first bout back, Tully is matched against a tough Mexican boxer named Lucero, who is of an advanced age and in considerable pain. They knock each other down before Tully is declared the winner. His celebration is brief when Tully discovers that he will be paid only $100, which causes him to end his business relationship with Ruben. He then returns to Oma's apartment and finds Earl there. Earl, still paying the rent, assures him that the alcoholic Oma wants nothing more to do with Tully.

Munger is returning home from a fight one night when he sees Tully drunk in the street. Munger tries to ignore him, but when Tully asks to have a drink, he reluctantly agrees to coffee. The two men sit and drink, and Tully looks around at all the people immediately around him, all of whom now seem at an impassable distance. Munger says he needs to leave, but Tully asks him to stay to talk a while. Munger agrees, and the two men sit drinking their coffee together in silence.

Cast

Production
Like the novel, the film was set in Stockton, California and shot mostly on location there. All of the original skid row depicted in the novel was demolished (West End Redevelopment) from 1965 to 1969. Most of the skid row scenes were filmed in the outer fringe of the original skid row, which was torn down a year after Fat City was filmed in order to make way for the construction of the Crosstown Freeway, aka Ort Lofthus Freeway.

The drama is featured in the documentary Visions of Light: The Art of Cinematography (1992) for Conrad L. Hall's use of lighting.

The melancholic "Help Me Make It Through the Night" is sung by Kris Kristofferson at the beginning and end of the movie.

Meaning of title
In a 1969 interview with Life magazine, Leonard Gardner explained the meaning of the title of his novel.
"Lots of people have asked me about the title of my book. It's part of Negro slang. When you say you want to go to Fat City, it means you want the good life. I got the idea for the title after seeing a photograph of a tenement in an exhibit in San Francisco. 'Fat City' was scrawled in chalk on a wall. The title is ironic: Fat City is a crazy goal no one is ever going to reach."  Fat City is also an old nickname for Stockton, California, where the novel and film are set. The nickname preceded Gardner's novel.

Release
The film premiered in the United States on July 26, 1972. It was screened at film festivals including the Cannes Film Festival and the Palm Springs International Film Festival.

Reception

Critical response
After a string of box office flops, John Huston rebounded with this film, which opened to tremendous praise and good business, and he was soon in demand for more work.
Vincent Canby, film critic for The New York Times, liked the film and Huston's direction. He wrote, "This is grim material but Fat City is too full of life to be as truly dire as it sounds. Ernie and Tully, along with Oma (Susan Tyrrell), the sherry-drinking barfly Tully shacks up with for a while, the small-time fight managers, the other boxers and assorted countermen, upholsterers, and lettuce pickers whom the film encounters en route, are presented with such stunning and sometimes comic accuracy that Fat City transcends its own apparent gloom."

Roger Ebert made the case for it as one of Huston's best films. He also appreciated the performances. Ebert wrote, "[Huston] treats [the story] with a level, unsentimental honesty and makes it into one of his best films...[and] the movie's edges are filled with small, perfect character performances."

J. Hoberman of the Village Voice wrote, "The movie is crafty work and very much a show. In one way or another, right down to the percussively abrupt open ending, it's all about being hammered."

Dave Kehr of the Chicago Reader wrote, "John Huston's 1972 restatement of his theme of perpetual loss is intelligently understated."

Film critic Dennis Schwartz wrote, "The downbeat sports drama is a marvelous understated character study of the marginalized leading desperate lives, where they have left themselves no palpable way out. The stunning photography by Conrad Hall keeps things looking realistic."

In 2009, Fat City enjoyed a week-long revival screening at New York City's Film Forum.

It has a 100% fresh rating on Rotten Tomatoes, based on 22 reviews, with a weighted average of 8.5/10. The site's consensus reads: "Fat City is a bleak, mordant, slice of life boxing drama that doesn't pull its punches".

Awards
Wins
 Kansas City Film Critics Circle: KCFCC Award Best Actor Stacy Keach, (tied with Marlon Brando for The Godfather); 1972.
 Belgian Film Critics Association: Grand Prix; 1974.

Nominations
 Academy Awards: Best Actress in a Supporting Role, Susan Tyrrell; 1973.

New York Film Critics Circle
Under the then-extant rules, Stacy Keach should have been awarded Best Actor from the New York Film Critics Circle for his portrayal of Tully because it required only a plurality of the vote. Keach was the top vote-getter for Best Actor. At the time, the NYCC was second in prestige only to the Academy Awards and was a major influence on subsequent Oscar nominations. A vocal faction of the NYFCC, dismayed by the rather low percentage of votes that would have given Keach the award, successfully demanded a rule change so that the winner would have to obtain a majority. In subsequent balloting, Keach failed to win a majority of the vote, and he lost ground to the performance of Marlon Brando in The Godfather. However, Brando could not gain a majority either. As a compromise candidate, Laurence Olivier in Sleuth eventually was awarded Best Actor.

Coincidentally, director John Huston had initially wanted Brando to play the role of Tully. When Brando informed Huston repeatedly that he needed some more time to think about it, Huston finally came to the conclusion that the star wasn't really interested and looked for another actor until he finally cast the then relatively unknown Keach.

See also
 List of American films of 1972

References

External links
 
 
 
 
 Fat City at Noir of the Week by noir historian William Hare

1972 films
1970s English-language films
1970s sports drama films
American sports drama films
American boxing films
Films directed by John Huston
Columbia Pictures films
Films based on American novels
American neo-noir films
Films set in California
1972 drama films
1970s American films